One Fat Summer is a teen drama novel written by American author Robert Lipsyte, published in 1977. In 2018, the novel was adapted into a motion picture titled Measure of a Man, starring Blake Cooper, Donald Sutherland, Luke Wilson and Judy Greer and was distributed by Great Point Media.

Characters 

 Bobby Marks
 Dr. Kahn – an estate owner who hires Bobby to manage the lawn
 Lenore Marks – Bobby's mother
 Marty Marks – Bobby's father
 Joanie Williams – Bobby's friend

Film adaptation 

In June 2015, director Jim Loach started pre-production for the film with screenwriter David Scearce, who wrote the screenplay, based on Robert Lipsyte's novel. The film went into production several months later when Donald Sutherland and The Maze Runner star Blake Cooper joined the cast on September 23, 2015. Sutherland plays Dr. Kahn, and Blake Cooper plays character Bobby. On October 5, 2015, Judy Greer and Luke Wilson joined the film alongside Sutherland and Cooper, to play Bobby's parents. The film was released on May 11, 2018.

See also 

 List of teen dramas

References

External links 

 Official website

1977 American novels
American young adult novels
Harper & Row books